Diwash Subba  is a Bhutanese international footballer. He made his first appearance for the Bhutan national football team in 2012.

References

Bhutanese footballers
Bhutan international footballers
Bhutanese people of Nepalese descent
Yeedzin F.C. players
Living people
1989 births
Association football forwards